Silvio Piola (29 September 1913 – 4 October 1996) was an Italian footballer who played as a striker. He is known as a highly prominent figure in the history of Italian football due to several records he set, and he is regarded as one of the greatest strikers of his generation, as well as one of the best Italian players of all time. Piola was part of the squad that won the 1933–35 Central European International Cup & the squad that won the 1938 FIFA World Cup with Italy, scoring two goals in the final, ending the tournament as the second best player and the second highest scorer.

Piola is third in the all-time goalscoring records of the Italy national team. He is also the highest goalscorer in Italian first league history, with 290 goals (274 in Serie A and 16 in Divisione Nazionale), and also in Serie A history. He played 566 Serie A games, putting him fourth on the all-time list for appearances in Italy's top flight. Piola is the only player to have the honour of being the all-time Serie A top scorer of three different teams (Pro Vercelli, Lazio and Novara) Piola is also the highest scoring Italian player in all competitions, with 364 goals (391 if his goals in the Divisione Nazionale and for the Italy B team are also included). Throughout his career, including friendlies, Piola scored 682 goals.

After his death a pair of Italian stadiums were renamed after him: one in Novara in 1997 and another in Vercelli in 1998. In 2011, he was posthumously inducted into the Italian Football Hall of Fame.

Club career
Piola began his career with Italian club side Pro Vercelli, making his Serie A debut against Bologna on 16 February 1930, scoring 13 goals in his first year, at the age of 17. On 29 October 1933, Piola scored six goals, the joint-most goals scored in a single match in Serie A, in a 7–2 win over Fiorentina. He went on to score 51 goals in 127 appearances in Serie A for Pro Vercelli.

In 1934, he moved to Lazio, who had been on the receiving end of his first Serie A goal on 11 November 1930. He was to spend the next nine seasons there. Piola was the Serie A top scorer twice while at Lazio, in 1937 and 1943. Piola was Lazio's highest all-time leading goalscorer with 149 goals until it was surpassed in 2021 by Ciro Immobile.

After leaving Lazio, he spent war-torn 1944 at Torino, where he scored an amazing 27 goals in just 23 games. Toward the end of the war, he joined Novara. Then, from 1945 to 1947, Piola played for Juventus, before moving back to Novara, where he stayed for seven more seasons. During his final years with Novara, Piola became the oldest player in Serie A history to score two goals in a single league match, a feat which he managed on 1 February 1953, at the age of 39 years, 4 months and 2 days, against his former team Lazio; the record stood until 20 April 2016, when Francesco Totti came off the bench and scored twice to help Roma come from behind to defeat Torino 3–2 at home, at the age of 39 years, 6 months and 23 days. To this day, Piola is still currently the highest all-time goalscorer in Serie A.

International career
His first game for Italy came against Austria on 24 March 1935, when he also scored his first goals for the team in the form of a brace to help Italy defeat the hosts Austria 2-0. He was a World Cup winner in 1938, when he scored two of Italy's goals in the 4–2 victory over Hungary; he finished the tournament as the second highest scorer and was named the second best player, also earning a place in the Team of the Tournament.

Piola went on to play 34 games for Italy and score 30 goals between 1935–1952, a tally that would surely have been greater if not for the interruption caused by World War II. He served as the national side's captain from 1940 until 1947. In 1939 he scored a goal with his hand to England 47 years before Diego Armando Maradona. His last international appearance was in 1952, when Italy drew 1–1 with England. Piola is currently Italy's third highest goalscorer of all-time, behind only Giuseppe Meazza, and Luigi Riva. He also co-holds, with Riva, the national team's record for most goals on opposition soil with 13.

Death
Piola died in Gattinara on 4 October 1996, aged 83.

Style of play
Regarded as one of the greatest strikers of all time, Piola was widely renowned for his goalscoring ability throughout his career, and his eye for goal. He was considered to be a modern and well-rounded player during his time, as he used his physical attributes, intelligence, and control to play with his back to goal, and lay off the ball for teammates in order to provide them with assists. Piola's vision, work-rate, and technical ability, as well as his passing ability, made him a tactically versatile player, who was capable of playing in several positions, and he was deployed on the wing, in midfield, or as a creative advanced playmaker or second striker on occasion. Piola particularly excelled as a centre-forward, however; his speed, positional sense, offensive movement, and opportunism enabled him to lose his markers with his attacking runs and receive his team-mates' deliveries or pounce on loose balls in the area. Piola was also known for his powerful and accurate finishing ability with his head and both feet, from any position on the pitch, which made him a prolific goalscorer throughout his career. Due to his agility and athletic ability, Piola also excelled in the air, and he was capable of scoring spectacular acrobatic goals from volleys and bicycle kicks. Despite his talent and his reputation, he was occasionally accused of diving throughout his career. Unlike his legendary international team-mate, club rival, and friend Giuseppe Meazza, however, with whom he was often compared, Piola was much more reserved both on and off the pitch, and he preferred to score through efficiency and pragmatism rather than flamboyance. On top of his playing ability and prolific goalscoring, Piola also stood out for his longevity throughout his career.

Career statistics

Club

International

Honours
Lazio
 Serie A: runner-up 1936–37
 Mitropa Cup: runner-up 1937

Juventus
 Serie A: runner-up 1945–46, 1946–47

Novara
 Serie B: 1947–48

Italy
 FIFA World Cup: 1938
 Central European International Cup: 1933–35

Individual
 Serie A top goalscorer: 1936–37, 1942–43
 Inducted into the Italian Football Hall of Fame: 2011 (posthumously)
 Inducted into the Walk of Fame of Italian sport: 2015

References

External links

 
 

1913 births
1996 deaths
People from Robbio
Italian footballers
Association football forwards
F.C. Pro Vercelli 1892 players
S.S. Lazio players
Torino F.C. players
Juventus F.C. players
Novara F.C. players
Serie A players
Serie B players
Italy international footballers
1938 FIFA World Cup players
FIFA World Cup-winning players
Italian football managers
Cagliari Calcio managers
Serie B managers
Footballers from Lombardy
Sportspeople from the Province of Pavia